Nameless is a populated place in Travis County, Texas, with a small portion extending into Williamson County. The community is also referred to as Cross Creek and Fairview.  Nameless is about 21 miles northwest from downtown Austin, and is a part of the Austin-Round Rock metropolitan area. It contains the Cherry Hollow Subdivision and a large portion of Nameless Road, which extends into both Jonestown, Texas and Leander, Texas.

History
A post office was established at Nameless in 1880, and remained in operation until it was discontinued in 1890. The locals ended up with the name "Nameless" after several applications containing other names were turned down by the post office. 

Nameless was first populated by Scott-Irish settlers. When the township was being organized townspeople attempted to submit names, one of which was Fairview, to the post office for recognition as a town, which was customary in those days. The post office repeatedly denied the various names because other towns already had claimed them.  The good folk of the community said, "Fine, we'll just stay nameless."  To which the postal Service said, "Be Nameless and be damned."

The town eventually became a part of the city of Leander, and the Nameless (Fairview) school closed in 1945.  The school was restored in 2008-2009, and it and the Nameless Cemetery are all that is left of the Nameless Community.

References

Geography of Travis County, Texas